Qi Hardware is an organization which produces copyleft hardware and software, in an attempt to apply the Free Software Foundation's GNU GPL concept of copylefting software to the hardware layer by using the CC-BY-SA license for schematics, bill of materials and PCB layout data. The project has been both a community of popular open hardware websites and a company, founded by Steve Mosher, Wolfgang Spraul and Yi Zhang, that makes hardware products. Formed from the now defunct Openmoko project, key members went on to form Qi Hardware Inc. and Sharism At Work Ltd. Thus far, the project has released the Ben Nanonote, the Milkymist One, and the Ben WPAN wireless project to create a copyleft wireless platform. The examples of Qi hardware projects are the Ben NanoNote pocket computer, Elphel 353 video camera and Milkymist One video synthesizer.

References

External links
 

 
Computer companies of the United States
Computer hardware companies
Electronics companies of the United States
Home computer hardware companies
Mobile phone manufacturers
Multinational companies headquartered in the United States
Networking hardware companies
Portable audio player manufacturers